Gonzalo Del Bono (born 8 February 1981 in Rafaela, Argentina) is an Argentine Association Football Forward currently playing for 9 de Julio de Rafaela of the Torneo Argentino B in Argentina.

Teams
  Atlético Rafaela 1997–1999
  River Plate 1999–2000
  Atlético Rafaela 2000–2006
  Xerez 2006–2007
  Atlético Rafaela 2007–2008
  Crucero del Norte 2009–2010
  Atlético San Jorge 2010
  9 de Julio de Rafaela 2011
  Crucero del Norte 2011–2012
  9 de Julio de Rafaela 2012–

External links
 
 

1981 births
Living people
People from Rafaela
Argentine footballers
Argentine expatriate footballers
Atlético de Rafaela footballers
Crucero del Norte footballers
Club Atlético River Plate footballers
Xerez CD footballers
Expatriate footballers in Spain
Association football forwards
Sportspeople from Santa Fe Province